Miss Mermaid is a South Korean television series starring Jang Seo-hee and Kim Sung-taek. It aired on MBC from June 24, 2002 to June 27, 2003 on Mondays to Fridays at 20:20 for 248 episodes.

Miss Mermaid became a nationwide hit upon airing, reaching a peak viewership rating of 43.6%. The cast won several trophies at the 2002 MBC Drama Awards, notably the Daesang ("Grand Prize") for Jang Seo-hee. The series led to Jang's pan-Asian popularity, particularly in China.

But Miss Mermaid was also criticized for Im Sung-han's sensationalistic writing and unrealistic plot twists, as well as the show's multiple extensions.

Plot
Eun Ah-ri-young is a successful television drama screenwriter with a past. Her father Eun Jin-sub had an affair and left their family for the other woman, and shortly after her autistic brother died and her mother Han Kyung-hye went blind. Ah-ri-young's unrelenting hate for her father throughout her childhood and adolescence drives her to meticulously plan her vengeance. Knowing that Jin-sub's new wife Shim Soo-jung is a popular actress, Ah-ri-young works her way up the ranks until she earns enough cachet in the TV industry. Then she writes a script that's a thinly veiled autobiography of her father's affair and its aftermath, and casts the unsuspecting Soo-jung in the role of the blind mother to make her feel guilty. To complete her revenge and cause the maximum amount of pain, Ah-ri-young also plots to steal the fiancé of her half-sister Eun Ye-young, the gentle-natured Lee Joo-wang. Helping Ah-ri-young in her plans is Jo Soo-ah, her mother's friend whose ulterior motive is that she wants Ah-ri-young to marry her son Ma Ma-joon. But Ah-ri-young finds herself falling in love with Joo-wang for real, and she eventually realizes that there is more to life than hatred and learns the true meaning of forgiveness.

Cast

Main 
Jang Seo-hee as Eun Ah-ri-young, a television screenwriter
Jung Young-sook as Han Kyung-hye, Ah-ri-young's mother
Park Geun-hyung as Eun Jin-sub, Ah-ri-young's father, Kyung-hye's ex-husband
Han Hye-sook as Shim Soo-jung, a famous actress, Jin-sub's wife
Woo Hee-jin as Eun Ye-young, a reporter, jin-sub and Soo-jung's daughter
Sa Mi-ja as Geum Ok-sun, Joo-wang's grandmother
Kim Yong-rim as Geum Sil-ra, Joo-wang's mother
Kim Byung-ki as Lee Sung-soo, the president of Sun Daily Newspaper, Joo-wang's father
Kim Sung-taek as Lee Joo-wang, a reporter, Ye-young's fiancé
Go Doo-shim as Jo Soo-ah a.k.a. Jo Young-chun, a friend of Kyung-hye and Soo-jung
Jeong Bo-seok as Ma Ma-joon, Soo-ah's son
Lee Jae-eun as Ma Ma-rin, Soo-ah's daughter
Choi Jae-ho as An Hyung-sun, a television director

Supporting 
Seo Kwon-soon as Hong Mi-sung, the mother of Ah-ri-young's ex-boyfriend
Yoo Hye-ri as herself
Jeon Mi-seon as Yoon Sung-mi, a reporter who is friend of Ah-ri-young
Choi Seon-ja as Dong-jin's mother, a housekeeper of the Lee family
Sa Kang as Yoo Jin-kyung, Ma-rin's friend
Park Tam-hee as Baek Soo-rim, Mi-sung's ex-daughter-in-law

Awards
2002 MBC Drama Awards
Daesang (Grand Prize): Jang Seo-hee
Top Excellence Award, Actress in a Serial Drama: Jang Seo-hee
Excellence Award, Actress in a Serial Drama: Woo Hee-jin
Special Acting Award: Han Hye-sook, Jung Young-sook, Park Geun-hyung
Best New Actor: Kim Sung-taek
Writer of the Year: Im Sung-han
Best Couple Award: Kim Sung-taek and Jang Seo-hee
Viewer's Choice, Actress of the Year: Jang Seo-hee
Journalists' Choice, Actress of the Year: Jang Seo-hee

References

External links

MBC TV television dramas
2002 South Korean television series debuts
2003 South Korean television series endings
Korean-language television shows
South Korean romance television series
South Korean melodrama television series